The World of Malgudi (2000) is a collection of four short Malgudi novels written by R. K. Narayan.

The novels in this collection are:

Mr. Sampath - The Printer of Malgudi (1949)
The Financial Expert (1952)
The Painter of Signs (1976)
A Tiger for Malgudi (1983)

2000 short story collections
Short story collections by R. K. Narayan
Penguin Books books